Susan J. Dlott (born September 11, 1949) is a senior United States district judge of the United States District Court for the Southern District of Ohio.

Early life and education

Dlott was born in Dayton, Ohio, on September 11, 1949, to Jewish Russian immigrant parents. Dlott received a Bachelor of Arts degree from the University of Pennsylvania in 1970 and a Juris Doctor from Boston University School of Law in 1973.

Legal and judicial career

She was a law clerk to Alvin Krenzler and Jack Day of the Ohio Court of Appeals from 1973 to 1974, then became an Assistant United States Attorney for the Southern District of Ohio from 1975 to 1979. She entered private practice in Cincinnati, Ohio, in 1979. In 1981, Dlott became the first female partner at Graydon Head & Ritchey, a Cincinnati law firm.

Federal judicial service

On August 10, 1995, President Bill Clinton nominated Dlott to a seat on the United States District Court for the Southern District of Ohio vacated by S. Arthur Spiegel. Dlott was confirmed by the United States Senate on December 22, 1995, and received her commission on December 26, 1995. She served as chief judge of the court from 2009 to 2015. She assumed senior status on May 31, 2018.

Notable case

Dlott approved a landmark Cincinnati anti-racial profiling agreement in 2002.

Personal life

Dlott's first husband was builder and developer Austin Eldon Knowlton. Her second and current husband is Stanley M. Chesley; they married in 1991. Chesley, a former trial lawyer, was disbarred by the Kentucky Supreme Court in 2013.

The estate has a wine cellar and two four-car garages with apartments on top.

Dlott and her husband were victims of a violent, armed home invasion robbery by "three black men with guns and masks", Terry Darnell Jackson, 21, Demetrius Williams, 20, and Darrell Joseph Kinney, 20, on December 4, 2015. Chesley and Dlott, who were held at gunpoint, both sustained injuries. The three perpetrators were apprehended and pleaded guilty, and in April 2016, the men were all sentenced to 34 years in prison. Dlott gave testimony at the sentencing hearing.

Dlott was described by the Cincinnati Enquirer in 2002 as "sometimes eccentric, often unconventional." Dlott has described herself as a "lenient judge". She is known for her fondness for Cavalier King Charles Spaniels.

See also
 List of Jewish American jurists

References

External links
 
 Profile of Susan J. Dlott from the Southern District of Ohio website
 Profile of Susan J. Dlott from the United States Court of Appeals for the Sixth Circuit website

1949 births
Living people
American people of Russian-Jewish descent
Assistant United States Attorneys
Boston University School of Law alumni
Judges of the United States District Court for the Southern District of Ohio
Ohio lawyers
People from Dayton, Ohio
United States district court judges appointed by Bill Clinton
University of Pennsylvania alumni
20th-century American lawyers
20th-century American judges
21st-century American judges
20th-century American women judges
21st-century American women judges